Monica Emily Wichfeld (née Massy-Beresford; 12 July 1894 – 27 February 1945) was a leading member of the Danish resistance during the German occupation of Denmark in the Second World War.

Early life
Wichfeld was born in London and raised in St. Hubert's in County Fermenagh, Northern Ireland. She was the daughter of an aristocratic Anglo-Irish family including John George Beresford Massy-Beresford and Hon. Alice Elizabeth Mulholland, and was  granddaughter of John Mulholland, 1st Baron Dunleath of Ballywalter, County Down. She was involved in the Northern Irish unionist militia Ulster Volunteers during the Home Rule Crisis, and participated in the distribution of firearms associated with the 1914 SS Clyde Valley Larne gun-running operation led by Major Frederick H. Crawford. Wichfeld's favorite brother, Lieutenant John Clarina Massy-Beresford served with the Royal Field Artillery in World War I and was killed in action in 1918 at the age of 21. After this event, Wichfeld was reported to have harboured a personal hatred of the Germans.

Marriage

On 15 June 1916, she married Danish aristocrat and diplomat Jørgen Adalbert Wichfeld (16 August 1885 - 30 July 1966), the Secretary of the Danish Legation to London. Wichfeld and her husband moved to his Engestofte Estate in Maribo Denmark, where she became a Danish citizen and had three children: Ivan (1919), Varinka (1922) and Viggo (1924).  During this time, she became friends and lovers with  Kurt Heinrich Eberhard Erdmann Georg von Haugwitz-Hardenberg-Reventlow who lived in neighbouring Hardenberg Manor. The relationship with Reventlow would continue for nine years. Jørgen Wichfield was aware of the relationship and unconcerned with it, naming Reventlow as Varinka's godfather. When the relationship ended, Reventlow went on to marry Barbara Hutton.

The 1920s Danish tax reforms created a decline in the family's financial status, and the Wichfelds moved to Campo dei Fiori, a house owned by Wichfeld's mother in Rapallo on the Italian Riviera. Wichfeld travelled widely in Europe during this time and socialized with many notable people of the era, including Noël Coward, Clementine Churchill and Tallulah Bankhead. As The Great Depression came to Europe, the family fell further in decline, and Wichfeld took matters into her own hands. She moved alone to Paris to develop a custom line of beauty products, including a Coco Channel-based essence, a fingernail protectant called No-Crax, as well as a profitable line of jewelry which reinvigorated the family's financial standing.

Danish Resistance in World War II

After the outbreak of World War II Wichfeld's family was forced to leave Italy when Mussolini ordered British citizens leave the country in 1941. She returned to Engestofte in Denmark, and began to actively seek out supporters of the Danish resistance. In the summer of 1942 she rented a cottage at Engestofte to journalist Hilmar Wulff and his wife along with dissident poet Halfdan Rasmussen. All three were members of the Danish Communist Party and Wulff was the editor of two underground newspapers Frit Denmark (Free Denmark) and Land og Folk (Land and People). Wichfeld began to drum up funds to feed the production and distribution of the papers, and to fund the underground activities of the Communist Party. Later that year, in a new partnership with Erik Kiersgaard a member of the resistance who had organized a sabotage unit, Wichfeld began to store firearms, ammunition and explosives at Engestofte to support their cause.

Through Count Carl-Adam "Bobby" Moltke, the son of a former Danish Foreign Affairs Minister and deeply connected member of the political underground of Copenhagen, Wichfeld met Flemming Muus, a man that had trained under Winston Churchill's Special Operations Executive, and would eventually become her son-in-law. Wichfeld made her estate available to Muus to house the top-secret SOE agent Jens Jacob Jensen, codenamed "Jacob" and shelter him. Eventually she and Jacob grew to lead the Lolland resistance and Engestofte became central to the recruitment, training, arming, planning, direction and organization of the actions of the resistance (such as the bombing of the Naskov shipyard), as well as being a receiving ground for British paratroopers and weapons drops. When the resistance gained momentum and the Nazis sent in forces to quell it, Wichfeld was instrumental in facilitating the escape of Danish patriots fleeing the country, including Himar Wulff and his wife. During this time, she also challenged the Danish resistance, who was reticent to facilitate safe passage for Jewish families, and personally began to harbour a Jewish family being sought by the Gestapo.

Arrest, imprisonment and death
In late 1942 telephone transmissions between Jacob and other resistance members were intercepted by Gestapo wiretaps and led to the arrest of Jacob in Århus. Under interrogation and torture, Jacob gave away the names of forty-four resistance fighters and a hundred Danish families working with them. Wichfeld was one of them. Despite having received rumours that the Gestapo had evidence against her and would be coming to arrest her, Wichfield refused to leave Engestofte saying "I have joined the struggle for Denmark. I am willing to pay the price." In January 1944, she was arrested at Engestofte and imprisoned in Copenhagen's Vestre Fængsel prison where she was subjected to daily interrogation for four months. The resistance did mount a rescue plan that involved bribing a Gestapo agent to help facilitate her escape with a staged ambush, but the agent bungled the plan by getting drunk and having himself revealed. The Gestapo staged the transfer of an agent disguised as Wichfeld to try and capture the resistance ambush team that included her daughter Varinka and Flemming Muus, but the team recognized the agent as a decoy and did not attack.

In May 1944, Wichfeld stood trial with ten other defendants in the resistance. Together with Georg Quistgaard and two others she was sentenced to death but told she could beg clemency to have it commuted to a life sentence. She asked the court if the same offer extended to the other defendants, and when it was not, turned it down flatly, and then sat down and casually powdered her nose.

There was outrage across the country at her sentence, as capital punishment for women had long since been considered barbaric in Denmark.
The sentence was later turned over into a life sentence, and because there was no penal servitude for women in Denmark, she was transferred with other women captured as part of the resistance Hvidsten group to Cottbus POW camp in Germany, and eventually transferred to Waldheim Prison. She died there of pneumonia on 27 February 1945 after a long bout of tuberculosis, one month before the end of World War II.

Wichfeld is listed on the memorial wall in Ryvangen Memorial Park indicating that the whereabouts of her remains are unknown.

See also
 Danish resistance movement

References

World War II resistance movements
Danish female resistance members
Female resistance members of World War II
Danish people who died in Nazi concentration camps
1894 births
1945 deaths
20th-century Danish nobility
Monica
Deaths from pneumonia in Germany